Maria Cocuzza (born 23 July 1973) is an Italian gymnast. She competed in five events at the 1988 Summer Olympics.

Cocuzza was married to Francesco Virlinzi, who died in 2000, aged 41.

At the 2020 Olympic Games, she served as a judge evaluating competitors in women's floor exercise.

References

External links
 

1973 births
Living people
Italian female artistic gymnasts
Olympic gymnasts of Italy
Gymnasts at the 1988 Summer Olympics
Sportspeople from Catania